The Estrellas Poker Tour (ESPT) started in April 2010, is a major regional poker tour in the Spain. The ESPT is sponsored by PokerStars.com.

Season 1

Season 2

Season 3

Season 4

Season 5

Season 6

Winners by country

Up to Season 6 (25 August 2015)

Notes

References

External links 
Official site
Facebook page
Twitter page
Official Sponsor

Poker tournaments in Europe
Recurring events established in 2010